Marcus Valerius Messalla Appianus (also known as Marcus Valerius Messalla Barbatus Appianus; c. 45 BC – 12 BC) was a Roman Senator during the reign of Augustus. He was ordinary consul in 12 BC with Publius Sulpicius Quirinius as his colleague.

Family background
Not much is known about his family background and early life. Appianus may have been the son of Appius Claudius Pulcher consul of 38 BC by an unnamed wife. He was probably adopted by Marcus Valerius Messalla, suffect consul 32 BC, thus becoming Marcus Valerius Messalla Barbatus Appianus.

Political career
According to the French historian Fr. François Catrou et Rouillé, Appianus served as a quaestor in the army of the Roman Triumvir Mark Antony. After this, little is known about his remaining political career beyond his consulship in 12 BC. He died not long afterwards.

Marriage and issue
About 14 BC, Appianus married Claudia Marcella Minor, a daughter of Octavia the Younger; Claudia Marcella Minor's maternal uncle was the Roman emperor Augustus. Marcella bore Appianus two children, a daughter Claudia Pulchra and a son Marcus Valerius Messalla Barbatus. Although there has been some speculation that Claudia's father might actually have been Publius Claudius Pulcher, the son of Clodius.

References

Sources
 R. Syme, The Augustan Aristocracy, Clarendon Press, 1986
 UGO FUSCO – GIAN LUCA GREGORI, A PROPOSITO DEI MATRIMONI DI MARCELLA MINORE E DEL MONVMENTVM DEI SUOI SCHIAVI E LIBERTI, aus: Zeitschrift für Papyrologie und Epigraphik 111 (1996) 226–232, Dr. Rudolf Habelt GmbH, Bonn
 M. Lightman & B. Lightman, A to Z of Ancient Greek and Roman Women, Infobase Publishing, 2008
 Jesuit François Catrou et Rouillé, Histoire romaine depuis la fondation de Rome [jusqu'a l'an 47 de J.-C.], avec des notes historiques, géographiques et critiques...par les RR. PP. Catrou et Rouillé de S. J. T. 01-20 (histoire romaine par Bernard Rothe, [sic pour Routh] T. 21)

40s BC births
12 BC deaths
1st-century BC Romans
Ancient Roman adoptees
Claudii
Imperial Roman consuls
Julio-Claudian dynasty
Roman patricians
Appianus, Marcus
Year of birth uncertain